Caroline Harding (born in March 1962) is an English television actress and playwright. She has played recurring roles in the ITV soap opera Coronation Street and crime drama Scott & Bailey, as well as in the Netflix six-part mockumentary sitcom Hard Cell. She has also written and performed in numerous theatrical productions, including her play Two Sisters, which received nominations for two Manchester Evening News Theatre Awards for Best Play and Best Performance in 2007, and a one-woman show about the eminent Restoration actress Nell Gwyn.

Early life and education 
Harding was born and raised in Marlow, Buckinghamshire, England. She graduated from the Guildford School of Acting and worked extensively for the Royal Shakespeare Company in the late '80s.

Career

Stage 

Together with fellow actress Candida Gubbins, she formed the theatre company Two Friends Productions in 2000. Soon after, she made her debut as a playwright with Postcards from Maupassant, a 2001 play based on the late 19th-century short stories by French author Guy de Maupassant, in which she also starred. It first premiered at the Edinburgh Festival and then, after receiving rave reviews from critics, went on a national tour. Sam Marlowe of The Times wrote: "All three actors are excellent throughout, but here Harding in particular is painfully funny and sad as the child-like, crazed wife. Her portrayal is still more impressive when you consider that, by contrast, just a couple of scenes earlier she was an elegant, icy society doyenne in sequins and silk." Ten years after the initial premiere, Harding adapted it into French Fancies.

Her next play was Two Sisters, a gripping black comedy set in 1880's Russia and directed by Chris Gascoyne. First performed in July 2006 at the Buxton Festival, it was soon followed by a national tour and nominations for two Manchester Evening News Theatre Awards for Best Play and Best Performance. Around the same time, Harding starred in the productions of Terrence McNally's Frankie and Johnny in the Clair de Lune (2004), Tom Stoppard's The Real Thing (2005) and Arthur Miller's Death of a Salesman (2007).

In 2008, she wrote and performed a one-woman show about one of the first actresses on the English stage and a long-time mistress of King Charles II of England, Nell Gwyn. She called it Pretty Witty Nell after a description of Gwyn by Samuel Pepys, the famed diarist and social commentator of the day. Described by Harding as "a sort of historical stand-up", the show toured the UK for two years.

Television 
Her television career began in a 1992 episode of the ITV crime drama Van der Valk, based on Nicolas Freeling's novels about a detective in Amsterdam, played by Barry Foster. She then appeared in all four episodes of the BBC Two medical drama Degrees of Error (1995), starring Beth Goddard, and all six episodes of the BBC One legal drama Fish (2000), starring Paul McGann in the eponymous role. In 2007, she briefly appeared opposite Robert Pattinson and Holly Grainger in The Bad Mother's Handbook, the television adaptation of the best-selling novel of the same name by Kate Long. She then had recurring roles in Scott & Bailey and Doctors in the early 2010s.

For three months in autumn 2020, she appeared in the ITV soap opera Coronation Street as Dr. Howarth, who treated the dying son of Steve McDonald and Leanne Battersby, and later told the court it would be an act of kindness and compassion to switch off his life support. Harding has also played five different characters, including three doctors, in another popular ITV soap opera, Emmerdale.

In 2022, she appeared as series regular Sal in Hard Cell, Catherine Tate's Netflix mockumentary sitcom set in a women's prison. Together with Lorna Brown, she led a storyline about a couple who found love in the prison and have no desire to leave.

Personal life 
Harding has been married to actor Chris Gascoyne, best known for his role as Peter Barlow in the soap opera Coronation Street, since 2002. In 2004, they starred opposite each other in the Octagon Theatre production of Frankie and Johnny in the Clair de Lune. The couple shares a daughter together named Belle. Harding also has two children, Pip and Freddie, from a previous marriage to actor Jason Watkins.

Filmography

References

External links 

 
 Caroline Harding at British Comedy Guide

Living people
1962 births
20th-century English actresses
20th-century British actresses
21st-century English actresses
21st-century British actresses
British stage actresses
English stage actresses
British television actresses
English television actresses
British dramatists and playwrights
English dramatists and playwrights
British women dramatists and playwrights
English women dramatists and playwrights
People from Marlow, Buckinghamshire
Alumni of the Guildford School of Acting
21st-century British dramatists and playwrights
21st-century English dramatists and playwrights